Football Club Pirin is a Bulgarian football club, based in Gotse Delchev. The club currently plays in the South-West Third League, the third tier of Bulgarian football league system. 

The team's biggest success came in 2012, when they managed to promote to the A PFG for the first time. Their spell in the top-flight lasted two years. Pirin play home games at the Gradski stadium, with a capacity of 5,000. They play in green and white stripped kits. The club logo represents the Pirin mountain range in Southwestern Bulgaria.

History 
Pirin Gotse Delchev were founded in 1925 as Pirin Nevrokop (Nevrokop being the former name of Gotse Delchev), and their traditional colours are green and white. In 1981–82 Pirin were promoted for the first time to B PFG. The club spent three years in second division, before being relegated in 1985 to third division. 

After 8 years in the lowers divisions of Bulgarian football, in 1993 Pirin returned to B PFG. In their first season back in second division Pirin finished in eight place in the league. In the following 1994–95 season was a poor one for the club, ending with the team in second lowest place and relegated back to the third division.

In 2005 the club won a third promotion to the B PFG in its history. In December 2005, Yordan Bozdanski was appointed as manager. Pirin finished the 2006–07 season in third place in the West B PFG, their highest finish in the league since their еstablishment.

On 27 June 2011, Yakov Paparkov was officially announced as the club's new manager. In the 2011–12 season, Pirin won the West B PFG with a 62 points, scoring 41 goals and losing only three times. Pirin were promoted to Bulgarian football's top division for the first time in their history.

Their first season in the top level of Bulgarian football was successful. The team managed to win 10 games and draw 4, earning them 34 points. These results placed them in 11th position, three points above the relegation zone. At home, Pirin managed to win 6 games, as well as draw 3, including a 1-1 draw against Levski Sofia, the eventual runners-up of the 2012-13 season. Away results were also good, considering that this was the debut season for Pirin in the elite. They managed to win 4 games and draw once. Manager for the season was Tencho Tenev, who was appointed at the beginning of the season. 

For the upcoming season, the format of the Bulgarian league was changed, with the bottom seven teams qualifying for the relegation group. Pirin did not manage to repeat the same results from last season, as the team spent the majority of the season in the relegation group. They started the season with a draw against Lokomotiv Sofia. This was followed by eight defeats in a row, which placed them at the bottom of the table. They eventually finished 13th in the regular season, thus being placed in the relegation zone. The team did not improve its results there, losing four out of their six home games, as well as losing five out of six away games. At the end of the season, Pirin were 32 points below the relegation line, thus being relegated. This ended Pirin's two year stay in the A Group. 

Although they were supposed to play in the B Group next season (2014-15), Pirin did not obtain a license due to financial constraints and was demoted to the third tier. 

At the end of the 2017-18 season, Pirin was relegated to the fourth amateur league.

After two seasons in the fourth tier, Pirin returned to the Third League in 2020. On June 6th, Pirin signed an agreement with OFC Pirin Blagoevgrad, at the time playing in the second tier. The agreement allowed young Pirin Blagoevgrad players to be loaned out to Pirin Gotse Delchev, thus making Pirin Gotse Delchev a satellite team of the other Pirin.

Honours

League
West B PFG
Champions: 2011–12

League positions

Current squad

Managers

References

External links 
 Official site
 Pirin Gotse Delchev at Bulgarian Club Directory.
 Pirin Gotse Delchev at Soccerway.

Pirin Gotse Delchev
1925 establishments in Bulgaria